Tulgas is a river in Arkhangelsk Oblast, Russia, a 29 km long left tributary of the Northern Dvina.

Geography
The river starts in swampy highlands south of the settlement of Rochegda (:ru:Рочегда) and flows through swampy and hilly taiga.

The river gave name to the area around it (Tulgas) and to some historical administrative subdivisions of Russia. The following villages are by the river:  Maslovskaya (Масловская), Stepanovskaya (Степановская) and Nironovskaya (Нироновская).

References

Rivers of Arkhangelsk Oblast